Oaklands railway line may refer to:

Oaklands railway line, New South Wales, Australia
Oaklands railway line, Victoria, Australia